Léopold Javal (1804–1872) was a French banker.

1804 births
1872 deaths
19th-century French Jews
French agronomists
French bankers
Officiers of the Légion d'honneur
Businesspeople from Mulhouse
Burials at Père Lachaise Cemetery
19th-century French businesspeople